Arnold Möller (4 May 1581 – 14 October 1655), was a German calligrapher.

Biography
Möller was a 17th-century German writing and arithmetic teacher who worked as a calligrapher in Lübeck. His publications were still reissued in the 18th century. He was trained in the Netherlands, possibly by Jan van de Velde the Elder in Haarlem, since his portrait was painted by the Haarlem artist Frans Hals. Möller is remembered today for his calligraphy and magic square puzzles left in the St. Catherine's Church, Lübeck, where he is buried.  His numerous works are in the Archives of the Hanseatic city of Lübeck and the city library.

References
 Antjekathrin Graßmann (Ed.): Lübeckische Geschichte. Schmidt-Römhild, Lübeck 1989, 
 Antjekathrin Graßmann: "Arnold Möller." In: Lübecker Lebensläufe, Neumünster 1993, 
 

1581 births
1655 deaths
German calligraphers
17th-century German mathematicians
People from Lübeck
Frans Hals